Katja von Garnier (born 15 December 1966, in Wiesbaden) is a German film director.

Biography
From 1989 to 1994, she studied at the University of Television and Film Munich. Her 1993 practice film Making Up! was shown in theatres all over Germany and attracted 1.2 million visitors. The project had been rejected by several producers who had not believed that a one-hour film could become a commercial success.

The 1997 film Bandits starring Katja Riemann was also a commercial success and was the winner of the Grand Prize at the 10th Yubari International Fantastic Film Festival held in February 1999.

In 1999, she was a member of the jury at the 49th Berlin International Film Festival.

In 2002, she directed in the United States for the first time. The resulting movie Iron Jawed Angels about the women's suffrage movement was produced by HBO Films and released in 2004.

Filmography 
1989: Tagtrauma (Short) 
1991: Lautlos (Short) 
1993: Making Up!
1997:  – Kix? (TV documentary series episode)
1997: Bandits
2004: Iron Jawed Angels (TV film)
2007: Blood & Chocolate
2013: Windstorm
2015: Windstorm 2
2015: Forever and a Day (portrait of the German band Scorpions)
2017: Windstorm 3

Awards 
1993 Bavarian Film Awards, Best New Director

Personal life
Together with her husband, director Markus Goller, and their son Merlin, Katja von Garnier lives in Los Angeles.

References

External links

German fan page

1966 births
Living people
Mass media people from Hesse
People from Wiesbaden
University of Television and Film Munich alumni